The 1995 season was the fourth full year of competitive football in Estonia as an independent nation. After having changed managers in 1994 — Roman Ubakivi replaced Uno Piir — the Estonia national football team continued in the qualifying tournament for the European Championship. Estonia performed worse in 1995 with twelve defeats in twelve games including four major losses. At the Baltic Cup the Estonian U-23 team competed, led by coach Aavo Sarap.

Results

Vietnam vs Estonia

Norway vs Estonia

Cyprus vs Estonia

Italy vs Estonia

Slovenia vs Estonia

Estonia vs Ukraine

Latvia vs Estonia

Lithuania vs Estonia

Estonia vs Slovenia

Estonia vs Lithuania

Croatia vs Estonia

Lithuania vs Estonia

Notes

References
 RSSSF detailed results
 RSSSF detailed results
 RSSSF detailed results
 RSSSF detailed results

1995
1995 national football team results
National